Dexter Wayne Lehtinen (born March 23, 1946) is an American attorney, former politician, interim U.S. Attorney for south Florida, and a law professor. He is the husband of former U.S. Congresswoman Ileana Ros-Lehtinen.

Early life and education
Lehtinen is of Finnish ancestry. He graduated from the University of Miami in 1968 magna cum laude with a Bachelor of Arts degree. He then graduated with an MA from Columbia University and an MBA in 1974. In 1975, he graduated first in his class from Stanford Law School. At the University of Miami, he was the Commander of the Corps of Cadets, president of the Florida Federation of College  Republicans, and was inducted into the Iron Arrow Honor Society, the highest owner bestowed at the university. 

He joined the United States Army as an officer. He received a Purple Heart in 1971 for severe facial injuries during the Vietnam War.

Florida legislature

In 1980, Lehtinen ran against incumbent Democratic State Representative Gene Flinn in a multi-member southwest Dade County district. Lehtinen came in first in the Democratic primary, garnering 44% of the vote against Flinn and another candidate. In the September primary runoff, Lehtinen defeated Flinn, 64 to 36%. In the general election, he narrowly defeated Republican nominee Chris Ferrer with 51.3% of the vote. In 1982, he won reelection in the newly redrawn 118th district—encompassing parts of rural southwestern Dade and areas stretching from Homestead to Richmond Heights—with 65%. In 1984, he won reelection unopposed.

In February 1985, he left the Democratic Party to become a Republican. This was only a few months before he married Republican State Representative Ileana Ros-Lehtinen. Lehtinen and his wife were both elected in 1986 to the Florida Senate; he was elected in District 40—which included large parts of western and southwestern Dade, including parts of Coral Gables—and she was elected in neighboring District 34.

U.S. Attorney for South Florida
In June 1988, Lehtinen resigned his Florida Senate seat after U.S. Attorney General Edwin Meese took a "high-risk gamble" in naming him to succeed Leon Kellner as U.S. Attorney for the Southern District of Florida. His three biggest cases during his 3 ½ year tenure were the cases of former Panama leader Manuel Noriega, religious sect leader Yahweh ben Yahweh, and of Hialeah Mayor Raúl L. Martínez.

The U.S. Senate refused to act on his nomination and Lehtinen on January 13, 1992, called a news conference to announce his resignation. Lehtinen said his departure had nothing to do with a well-publicized internal Justice Department investigation of him because of the Martinez case. The Justice Department opened a case against Lehtinen on charges of misconduct and potential conflicts of interest for investigating "a potential political rival of his wife."

Post U.S. Attorney career
Lehtinen served as the general counsel for the Miccosukee Tribe of Florida Indians until May 2010. In November 2011, the same tribe filed a lawsuit against Lehtinen for alleged malpractice regarding tax advice. He also was a professor at University of Miami School of Law and at Florida International University.

Personal life
Lehtinen married then-Florida State Representative Ileana Ros on June 9, 1984, while they were both serving in the Florida House of Representatives. They have two children, Rodrigo and Patricia Marie. He was previously married to Donna L. Stevenson and had two children with her, Katharine Natasha and Douglas Hooper.

References

External links

|-

|-

|-

1946 births
Living people
United States Army personnel of the Vietnam War
Columbia Business School alumni
American people of Finnish descent
Florida state senators
Florida Republicans
Florida lawyers
Members of the Florida House of Representatives
Politicians from Miami
Spouses of Florida politicians
Stanford University alumni
United States Attorneys for the Southern District of Florida
University of Miami alumni
Florida Democrats
People from Homestead, Florida
United States Army officers